The Sarcophagus of Seianti Hanunia Tlesnasa is the life-size sarcophagus of an Etruscan noblewoman dating from between 150–140 BC. Since 1887, it has been part of the British Museum's collection.

Discovery
The brightly painted sarcophagus of the Etruscan aristocratic woman Seianti was discovered in 1886 at Poggio Cantarello near Chiusi in Tuscany and was subsequently sold, along with its contents (a skeleton and some grave belongings), to the British Museum. A similar sarcophagus is in the collections of the National Archaeological Museum in Florence. Known as the Sarcophagus of Larthia Seianti, the two women were probably from the same dynastic family in ancient Chiusi.

Description
The sarcophagus is a masterpiece of Etruscan artwork. The deceased woman's name is inscribed in Etruscan along the base of the chest.  She must have belonged to one of the richest families of Chiusi, as Seianti is dressed sumptuously for the occasion, wearing an ornate gown and cloak, with complicated drapery falling sinuously over her body, and adorned with a tiara, earrings, bracelets and a necklace. Seianti has been depicted as a mature lady, who gestures to adjust her veil, realistically revealing parts of her body in the process. She leans against a pillow and holds a mirror in her other hand, gazing into the distance.

Scientific analysis
Scientific analysis of the bones and teeth that were deposited in the chest indicated that Seianti probably died at about 50–55 years of age. The rather idealised face of the deceased woman depicted on the sarcophagus, which was typical of Etruscan art at the time, can be compared with an accurate and less flattering reconstruction of her face in the museum, based on the features of the deceased woman's skull.

See also
Sarcophagus of the Spouses

Gallery

Bibliography
O. Brendel, Etruscan Art, Pelican History of Art (Yale University Press, 1995)
L. Burn, The British Museum Book of Greek and Roman Art (British Museum Press, 1991)
E. Macnamara, Everyday Life of the Etruscans (Barsford/Putnams, 1973)
E. Macnamara, The Etruscans (London, The British Museum Press, 1990)
J. Prag and R. Neave, Making Faces: Using Forensic and Archaeoligical Evidence (London, The British Museum Press, 1997)
J. Swaddling and J. Prag (eds), Seianti Hanunia Tlesnasa. The Story of an Etruscan Noblewoman (British Museum Occasional Paper no.100, 2002, 2nd edition 2006, Trustees of the British Museum)

References

Ancient Greek and Roman sculptures in the British Museum
Etruscan ceramics
Etruscan sculptures
Sarcophagi
Terracotta sculptures in the United Kingdom
Archaeological discoveries in Italy
1886 archaeological discoveries